The scale-feathered malkoha (Dasylophus cumingi) is a species of cuckoo in the family Cuculidae.
It is endemic to the northern Philippines.

Description
Large, with unique plastic-like feathers on head and throat, sexes alike. And whole head grey, almost white on the throat with feather on top of head and Down center of throat to upper breast tipped with black scale-like feathers; upper back forming a continuous bend with chestnut on lower breast; back, wings, and graduated white-tipped tail glossy black on lower belly and under tail coverts.

References

scale-feathered malkoha
Birds of Luzon
scale-feathered malkoha
scale-feathered malkoha
Taxonomy articles created by Polbot
Taxobox binomials not recognized by IUCN